Don Tale is a 1964 Soviet drama film directed by Vladimir Fetin.

Plot 
The film tells about a red Cossack and his beloved woman, who, during childbirth, confesses to him that he is a spy for the White Guards.

Cast 
 Yevgeny Leonov as Yakov Shibalok
 Lyudmila Chursina as Darya
 Aleksandr Blinov as Nikolka
 Boris Novikov as Ivan Chudukov
 Nikolai Melnikov as Alyosha
 Aleksey Gribov as Kuzmich (as A. Gribov)
 Liliya Gurova
 Sergei Lyakhnitsky as Ivanich
 Leonid Parkhomenko
 Georgy Satini

References

External links 
 

1964 films
1960s Russian-language films
Soviet drama films
1964 drama films